Renata Adler (born October 19, 1938) is an American author, journalist, and film critic. Adler was a staff writer-reporter for The New Yorker, and in 1968–69, she served as chief film critic for The New York Times. She is also a writer of fiction.

Early life
Adler was born in Milan, Italy, to Frederick L. and Erna Adler while they were traveling from Germany to the United States. She has two older brothers. Her family had fled Nazi Germany in 1933 and moved to the U.S. in 1939.

She grew up in Danbury, Connecticut. After earning her B.A. (summa cum laude) in philosophy and German literature from Bryn Mawr College, where she studied under José Ferrater Mora, Adler studied for an M.A. in comparative literature at Harvard under I. A. Richards and Roman Jakobson. She then pursued her interest in philosophy, linguistics and structuralism at the Sorbonne under the tutelage of Jean Wahl and Claude Lévi-Strauss, and later received a J.D. from Yale Law School and an honorary doctorate of laws from Georgetown University.

Career

Journalism
In 1962, Adler became a staff writer-reporter for The New Yorker. In 1968, despite not being involved in the film trade, she succeeded Bosley Crowther as film critic for The New York Times. Her esoteric, literary reviews were not well received by film studio distributors. She was not happy with the Timess deadlines and in February 1969, she was replaced by Vincent Canby.

Her film reviews were collected in her book, A Year in the Dark. During her time at the Times she retained her office at The New Yorker and she rejoined the staff there after leaving the Times, remaining for four decades.

Her reporting and essays for The New Yorker on politics, war, and civil rights were reprinted in Toward a Radical Middle. Her introduction to that volume provided an early definition of radical centrism as a political philosophy. Her "Letter from the Palmer House" was included in the collection The Best Magazine Articles of the Seventies.

In 1980, upon the publication of her New Yorker colleague Pauline Kael's collection When the Lights Go Down, she published an 8,000-word review in The New York Review of Books that dismissed the book as "jarringly, piece by piece, line by line, and without interruption, worthless", arguing that Kael's post-1960s work contained "nothing certainly of intelligence or sensibility", and faulting her "quirks [and] mannerisms", including Kael's repeated use of the "bullying" imperative and rhetorical question. Adler's motivations were considered to be either wanting to "uphold The New Yorker's usually high standards" or stemming from "personal differences with Kael". The piece, which stunned Kael and quickly became infamous in literary circles, was described by Time magazine as "the New York literary Mafia['s] bloodiest case of assault and battery in years." New Yorker editor William Shawn called Adler's attack "unfortunate" and mentioned his admiration for Kael, saying that her "work is its own defense"; David Denby, of New York magazine, wrote that Adler "had an old-fashioned notion of prose". Kael's own response was indifferent: "I'm sorry that Ms. Adler doesn't respond to my writing. What else can I say?"

In 1998, Renata wrote a long essay about the Starr Report (issued by Independent Counsel Ken Starr about his investigation of President Bill Clinton) for Vanity Fair magazine. The Starr Report led to Clinton's impeachment; Adler argued that it contained evidence of Starr's abuse of power in his pursuit of Clinton. She called the Starr Report "an utterly preposterous document: inaccurate, mindless, biased, disorganized, unprofessional, and corrupt. What it is textually is a voluminous work of demented pornography, with many fascinating characters and several largely hidden story lines. What it is politically is an attempt, through its own limitless preoccupation with sexual material, to set aside, even obliterate, the relatively dull requirements of real evidence and constitutional procedure."

In 2001, reflecting on her years in journalism, Adler said, "The New York Times was pretty good, although there were always limits on what it could do culturally. But they were so aware of their power that the question of what was honorable was very important to the editors of that time. I have the impression it does not arise any longer at The New Yorker or at The New York Times."

Adler taught for three years in both the University Professors Honors Program and the Journalism Department of Boston University. She also held Trumbull and Branford Fellowships at Yale, and visiting fellowships at the Hoover Institute of Stanford University.

Books

Fiction
In 1974, Adler's short story "Brownstone" won first prize in the O. Henry Awards. She has published two novels, Speedboat (1976) and Pitch Dark (1983). In 2010, members of the National Book Critics Circle called for Speedboat to be returned to print, and it was republished by New York Review Books in 2013, along with Pitch Dark. Both were greeted with new critical acclaim.

Non-fiction
Adler's book, Reckless Disregard: Westmoreland v. CBS et al., Sharon v. Time (1986), an account of two libel trials and the First Amendment, was also praised: "This book should be under the Christmas tree of every lawyer and journalist", wrote William B. Shannon in The Washington Post. The journalist Edwin M. Yoder wrote, also in the Post, "Reckless Disregard is the best book about American journalism of our time."

Her book Gone: The Last Days of The New Yorker (1999) described what she saw as the magazine's decline in the 1980s and 1990s. The New York Times called it an "irritable little book" and criticized Adler for claiming that famed Watergate judge John Sirica was a "corrupt, incompetent, and dishonest figure, with a close connection to Senator Joseph McCarthy and clear ties to organized crime", without offering any proof. Adler rebutted this accusation in a detailed article, "A Court of No Appeal", published in Harper's in August 2000.

In 2001, Adler published Canaries in the Mineshaft: Essays on Politics and the Media, a collection of pieces from The New Yorker, the Atlantic, Harper's, The New Republic, The Los Angeles Times, Vanity Fair, and The New York Review of Books. Some of these, on Kael, the National Guard, Biafra, soap operas, impeachment inquiries (of both Richard Nixon and Bill Clinton), and the press, had received awards.

In 2008, Adler contributed an essay to the Corcoran Gallery of Art exhibition catalog Richard Avedon: Portraits of Power. Her introduction, a memoir of her close friendship and work with Avedon, includes details of her work as editor of his photo-essay for Rolling Stone magazine, "The Family" (1976).

In 2015, New York Review Classics published a collection of Adler's essays and reporting pieces as After the Tall Timber: Collected Non-Fiction.

In 2015, James Parker wrote in The Atlantic that Adler, "possessed a set of literary instincts not quite as canine as, say, Hunter S. Thompson’s—they lacked his snarl and drool, his hallucinatory hackles—but no less acute or telepathic, and in the end rather more dangerous."

Honors
In 1968, Adler's essay "Letter from the Palmer House", which appeared in The New Yorker, was included in The Best Magazine Articles of 1967. In 1975, Adler's short story "Brownstone" received first prize in the O. Henry Awards Best Short Stories of 1974. The same story was selected for the O. Henry Collection Best Short Stories of the Seventies.

Adler's novel Speedboat won the Hemingway Foundation/PEN Award, an annual award to recognize a distinguished achievement in debut fiction. In 1987, she was elected to the American Academy of Arts and Letters, and in 1989 she received an honorary doctorate from the Georgetown University School of Law. In 2021, Adler received an honorary doctorate from Oberlin College.

Her "Letter from Selma", originally published in the New Yorker in 1965, was included in the Library of America compendium Reporting Civil Rights: American Journalism 1963–1973 (2003), and an essay from her tenure as film critic of The New York Times, on In Cold Blood, is included in the Library of America compendium American Movie Critics: An Anthology From the Silents Until Now. In 2004, Adler served as a media fellow at Stanford University's Hoover Institution. In 2005, she became a Branford fellow at Yale University; she had been a Trumbull fellow at Yale from 1967 to 1979.

Personal life
Adler has one son, Stephen, whom she adopted as an infant in 1986. , she lives in Newtown, Connecticut.

Bibliography

Fiction
 
 

Nonfiction

Notes

External links

 

1938 births
20th-century American non-fiction writers
20th-century American novelists
20th-century American women writers
21st-century American non-fiction writers
21st-century American women writers
American film critics
American people of German descent
American women critics
American women non-fiction writers
American women novelists
Bryn Mawr College alumni
Critics employed by The New York Times
Harvard Graduate School of Arts and Sciences alumni
Hemingway Foundation/PEN Award winners
Living people
Members of the American Academy of Arts and Letters
O. Henry Award winners
People from Danbury, Connecticut
People from Newtown, Connecticut
Radical centrist writers
The New Yorker staff writers
American women film critics
Writers from Connecticut
Yale Law School alumni